Conner Jones (born February 22, 2006) is an American professional stock car racing driver. He competes part-time in the ARCA Menards Series, the ARCA Menards Series East, and the ARCA Menards Series West, driving Toyota Camrys for Venturini Motorsports, and part-time in the NASCAR Craftsman Truck Series, driving the No. 66 Ford F-150 for ThorSport Racing.

Racing career
Jones would start racing at five years old, driving in go-karts. In 2017, he would win the Bandolero Bandit Virginia state championship. In 2018, he made his debut in Legends car racing, and would get his first career win at Dominion Raceway. He drove in the INEX Virginia State Young Lions full-time in 2019, where he won the championship with six wins, twelve second-place finishes, and two third-place finishes. He made his debut in late model racing that year, finishing third in his first ever late model start at Hickory Motor Speedway.

NASCAR Advance Auto Parts Weekly Series
Jones drove in the NASCAR Advance Auto Parts Weekly Series in 2020, primarily racing at Hickory Motor Speedway and Dominion Raceway. He would rank eleventh at Hickory, and thirteenth at Dominion.

CARS Late Model Stock Tour
Jones would run the full CARS Late Model Stock Tour season in 2021, driving for various team. GMS Racing would sign him for one race at Caraway Speedway and JR Motorsports would sign him for four races. He would end up eleventh in point standings, getting three top tens.

ARCA Menards Series East
On May 1, 2021, Jones signed with GMS Racing to drive at the Nashville Fairgrounds Speedway in the ARCA Menards Series East. He started eighth and would finish in fourth, getting his best career East series finish. He would sign with Cook-Finley Racing later that season, for two races. He finished twenty-first at Iowa Speedway and tenth at Bristol Motor Speedway.

On January 5, 2022, Jones would sign with Venturini Motorsports, to run a partial schedule in the ARCA Menards Series and ARCA Menards Series East.

ARCA Menards Series
Jones drove for two races in the 2021 ARCA Menards Series, running the race's paired event with the East series, at Iowa Speedway and Bristol Motor Speedway. He finished twenty-first and tenth.

ARCA Menards Series West
Jones made his ARCA Menards Series West debut for Steve McGowan Motorsports at Phoenix Raceway, the season finale race. He started eighteenth and would finish nineteenth.

Craftsman Truck Series 
On February 13, 2023, ThorSport Racing announced that Jones will drive nine races for the team in the 2023 NASCAR Craftsman Truck Series season, driving the No. 66 truck.

Motorsports career results

NASCAR
(key) (Bold – Pole position awarded by qualifying time. Italics – Pole position earned by points standings or practice time. * – Most laps led.)

Craftsman Truck Series

ARCA Menards Series
(key) (Bold – Pole position awarded by qualifying time. Italics – Pole position earned by points standings or practice time. * – Most laps led.)

ARCA Menards Series East

ARCA Menards Series West

References

External links
 

Living people
2006 births
ARCA Menards Series drivers
NASCAR drivers
CARS Tour drivers
Racing drivers from Virginia
Sportspeople from Virginia